The following is a list of the 249 communes of the Morbihan department of France.

The communes cooperate in the following intercommunalities (as of 2022):
CA Golfe du Morbihan - Vannes Agglomération
CA Lorient Agglomération
Communauté d'agglomération de la Presqu'île de Guérande Atlantique (partly)
CA Redon Agglomération (partly)
Communauté de communes Arc Sud Bretagne
Communauté de communes Auray Quiberon Terre Atlantique
CC Baud Communauté
Communauté de communes de Belle-Île-en-Mer
Communauté de communes de Blavet Bellevue Océan
CC Centre Morbihan Communauté
Communauté de communes de l'Oust à Brocéliande
CC Ploërmel Communauté
CC Pontivy Communauté
CC Questembert Communauté
CC Roi Morvan Communauté

References

Morbihan